Jesús Clavería Domínguez (born 4 January 1968) is a Spanish former futsal player, best known for his spell with Inter Movistar as a goalkeeper.

Honours

Spain
2000 FIFA Futsal World Championship champion
1996 FIFA Futsal World Championship Second place
1992 FIFA Futsal World Championship Third place
1996 UEFA Futsal Championship, 2001 UEFA Futsal Championship champion
1999 UEFA Futsal Championship Second place

Interviú
1991 Futsal European Clubs Championship
2003-04 UEFA Futsal Cup
Intercontinental Futsal Cup 2005
Spanish League 1988/89, 1989/90, 1990/91, 1995/96, 2001/02, 2002/03, 2003/04
Spanish Cup 1987, 1990, 1996, 2001, 2004
Spanish Super Cup 1991, 1992, 1997, 2002, 2003, 2004

External links
FutsalPlanet.com

1968 births
Living people
Futsal goalkeepers
Sportspeople from Barakaldo
Spanish men's futsal players
Inter FS players